Humberto Hernandez-Haddad (born 1951 in Villahermosa, Tabasco) is a Mexican lawyer, former Mexican Senator and Federal Congressman, and Mexican Consul General to the United States of America in San Antonio, Texas.

Education
Hernandez-Haddad graduated law school with honors at the prestigious National Autonomous University of Mexico (UNAM) in 1972. That same year, he obtained the National "President Benito Juarez" Award for his thesis "A Constitutional Analysis of the Reform Laws".

In 1978, he became a fellow at Harvard University's Weatherhead Center for International Affairs in Cambridge, Massachusetts.

He obtained a master's degree in international public policy (MIPP) from Johns Hopkins University's Paul H. Nitze School of Advanced International Studies (SAIS) in 1981, for his studies in international economics.

He completed a course in French civilization at the Sorbonne University in 1981.

Political career
In 1973, at age 21, he was elected to serve his first term as Federal Congressman for the XLIX (49th) Legislature.

He was elected to his second term as Federal Congressman in 1979, during which he served as Chairman for the Chamber of Deputies' Science and Technology Committee.

From 1982 to 1988 he served as Senator for his home-state of Tabasco, and was appointed Chairman of the Senate Foreign Relations Committee. From 1983 to 1987 he was also Secretary of Foreign Affairs for the PRI National Executive Committee. A 1999 book said he was the youngest national in history to achieve all of his political positions in such short time.

In 1989 he was appointed Consul General of Mexico for South-Central Texas, based in San Antonio. He was elected Chairman of the Consular Corps for South Texas and served from 1991 to 1995.

As a result of his diplomatic performance as Consul General of Mexico in the United States of America he cancelled any membership or affiliation to the Partido Revolucionario Institucional (PRI).

President Andrés Manuel López Obrador appointed Humberto Hernandez Haddad as Under Secretary of Tourism of the Mexican government on 1 December 2018.

Awards
In 2002 he received the National Journalism Award for his editorial publications.

References

External links
 Humberto Hernández Haddad, El sureste petrolero, 2 November 2005, El Universal

Living people
Members of the Chamber of Deputies (Mexico)
Members of the Senate of the Republic (Mexico)
1951 births
National Autonomous University of Mexico alumni
People from Villahermosa
20th-century Mexican politicians
Politicians from Tabasco